Lottridge is an unincorporated community in Athens County, Ohio, United States.

History
A post office called Lottridge was established in 1850, and remained in operation until 1907. Postal services are now provided by the Guysville post office.

References

Populated places in Athens County, Ohio
1850 establishments in Ohio
Populated places established in 1850